The IIAC, short for Institut interdisciplinaire d'anthropologie du contemporain (Interdisciplinary Institute of Contemporary Anthropology), is a French anthropological research centre institutionally linked to the EHESS and to the CNRS.

The centre is composed of four main research units:
Edgar Morin Centre
Laboratoire d'anthropologie et d'histoire de l'institution de la culture
Laboratoire d'anthropologie des institutions et des organisations sociales
Anthropologie de l'écriture.

See also
Centre national de la recherche scientifique
École des hautes études en sciences sociales

External links
IIAC website (in French).

Social science institutes
Research institutes in France
French National Centre for Scientific Research